The 1983 Pan American Games included competitions in the martial art of Sambo for men and women at different weight bands. The United States finished with 8 gold medals in the event; the host nation Venezuela won 7, Cuba 3, Canada and Argentina one each.

Men's competition

48 kg

52 kg

57 kg

62 kg

68 kg

74 kg

82 kg

90 kg

100 kg

+ 100 kg

Women's competition

44 kg

48 kg

52 kg

56 kg

60 kg

64 kg

68 kg

72 kg

80 kg

+ 80 kg

Medal table

References 

Events at the 1983 Pan American Games
1983